Horsfieldia macilenta is a species of plant in the family Myristicaceae. It grows naturally as a tree in Sumatra, Peninsular Malaysia and Borneo.

References

macilenta
Trees of Sumatra
Trees of Peninsular Malaysia
Trees of Borneo
Vulnerable plants
Taxonomy articles created by Polbot